The Browning Block, a building on the southeast corner of Main and Center Sts. in Paris, Idaho, was built in 1905. The building has included specialty stores and a local bank. In addition, the building had some of the most lavish architecture in the city, as it featured a classically inspired frieze and decorative marquees.

The building was listed on the National Register of Historic Places in 1982.

References

External links

Commercial buildings on the National Register of Historic Places in Idaho
Commercial buildings completed in 1905
Buildings and structures in Bear Lake County, Idaho
National Register of Historic Places in Bear Lake County, Idaho
1905 establishments in Idaho